"When I'm Away from You" is a song written and originally recorded by Frankie Miller in 1979.  It was also recorded by Kim Carnes and included on her 1981 album Mistaken Identity.  The best-known version of the song was recorded by American country music duo The Bellamy Brothers.  It was released in January 1983 as the second single from the album  Strong Weakness.  The song was The Bellamy Brothers' seventh number one on the country chart.  The single stayed at number one for one week and spent twelve weeks on the country chart.

Charts

Weekly charts

Year-end charts

References

1983 singles
Kim Carnes songs
The Bellamy Brothers songs
Songs written by Frankie Miller
Song recordings produced by Jimmy Bowen
Elektra Records singles
Curb Records singles
1979 songs